Alexander Hamilton Rice Jr. (August 29, 1875July 23, 1956) was an American physician, geographer, geologist and explorer especially noted for his expeditions to the Amazon Basin.
He was professor of geography at Harvard University from 1929 to 1952, and was the founder and director of the Harvard Institute of Geographical Exploration.

Early life and military service
Alexander H. Rice Jr. was born in Roxbury, Massachusetts on August 29, 1875. His grandfather was former Boston mayor, Massachusetts governor and US Congressman Alexander Hamilton Rice.  After attending the Noble and Greenough School he earned an A.B. from Harvard College (1898) and an M.D. from Harvard Medical School (1904).  On October 6, 1915, he married widowed RMS Titanic survivor Eleanor Elkins Widener.

In 1914–1915 he volunteered for the Paris surgical staff of the Ambulance Américain, a group of American civilian doctors serving in Europe prior to the United States' entry into World War I. From 1915 to 1917 he directed the Hôpital 72, Société de Secours aux Blessés Militaires, a French charity hospital also in Paris.

On the United States' 1917 entry into the war, he was commissioned as a lieutenant in the United States Naval Reserve, directing the 2nd Naval District Training School for Reserve Officers at Newport, Rhode Island, where he served until 1919.  In 1919, he was awarded the Commandeur de la Légion d'honneur for his service to the people of France.

In 1922 Rice was the unsuccessful Republican nominee for US Congress from the Massachusetts 12th Congressional District.

Exploration and academic career

As a geographer and explorer Rice specialized in rivers.
On seven expeditions, beginning in 1907, he explored  of the Amazon Basin,
mapping a number of previously unmapped rivers in the northwestern area of the Amazon Basin reaching into Colombia and Venezuela.

After his 1915 marriage, his socialite wife accompanied him on several expeditions to South America which were chronicled in the geographic literature and followed closely by the popular press.  A 1916 expedition was the subject of a 1918 book by a colleague, William Thomas Councilman.  During a 1920 trip, it was reported that "the party warded off an attack by savages and killed two cannibals""scantily clad... very ferocious and of large stature". (A subsequent headline read: "Explorer Rice Denies That He Was Eaten By Cannibals".
In 1913, the Harvard College Class of 1898 Quindecennial Report had noted that, "An interesting feature of [Rice's] work in South America is frequent reports to the effect that he has been eaten by cannibals or has been a victim of the snakes which are said to be laying in wait for him all the time.")
On an expedition in 1919 he ascended the Orinoco to its upper reaches in Venezuela, but had a disastrous battle with a group of Yanomami, who can be belligerent but are in no sense cannibal, and this was the only example throughout the twentieth century of a scientific expedition shooting and killing Amazonian indigenous people.  That expedition continued, in 1920, to traverse the natural Casiquiare canal, and descend the Rio Negro to the Amazon at Manaus.  His most important exploration in 1924-25 was the first to use aerial photography (from a Curtis Sea-Gull biplane with floats) and shortwave radio for mapping. This four-month expedition ascended the Rio Branco and its Uraricoera headwater (past Maraca Island and the mighty Purumame waterfall) and then, leaving its boats, cutting trails into the Parima hills. The team had a peaceful encounter with another group of Yanomami whom Dr Rice found poor and repellent but was impressed by their magnificent conical yano hut. He also established hospitals for Indians in Brazil, researched tropical diseases, and conducted expeditions in Alaska and Hudson Bay.

His explorations of the Amazon and Orinoco Rivers won him honors which included: in 1914 Gold Medal of the Royal Geographical Society, London; Gold Medalist, Geographical Society of Philadelphia; Gold Medalist, Société Royale de Géographie d'Anvers; and gold medalist, Harvard Travelers Club.  He led his last expedition in 1924–1925.

Dr Rice was closely associated with the Royal Geographical Society in London. After being awarded its Patron's Medal in 1914, he lectured there frequently, and published reports of his various expeditions only in its The Geographical Journal, in 1914, 1918, 1921 and 1928. When the Society celebrated its centenary in 1930, he made the largest single donation (£25,000) to its appeal, which was used to build a lecture theater, library and other rooms at its headquarters. He gave many of his films and photographs to the RGS archive.

In 1926 Rice offered to finance a railway for 850 km (500 miles) from Manaus north to Boa Vista (then Rio Branco Territory; now State of Roraima) if he was granted an operating franchise and land along it; the local governor refused.

In 1929 Rice founded Harvard's Institute of Geographical Exploration, to which he and his wife provided a considerable endowment, and which under Rice's directorship became an important center for the science of photogrammetry.  Rice's other positions included Curatorship of the South American Section of the Peabody Museum of Archaeology and Ethnology; Lecturer in Diseases of Tropical South America at Harvard Medical School; and Trustee of the American Museum of Natural History.  He belonged to the Rhode Island Society of Colonial Wars, and the New Hampshire Society of the Cincinnati.

When the Institute closed in 1952, Rice retired to Miramar, his wife's family mansion in Newport, Rhode Island, where he died on July 23, 1956.

Genealogy
Rice was a descendant of Edmund Rice, an English immigrant to Massachusetts Bay Colony, as follows:

Alexander Hamilton Rice Jr., son of
John Hamilton Rice (1849–1899), son of
Alexander Hamilton Rice (1818–1895), son of
Thomas Rice (1782c. 1859), son of
John Rice (1751–1808), son of
Elijah Rice (b. 1728), son of
William Rice (c. 17001769), son of
Edmund Rice (1653–1719), son of
Edward Rice (1622–1712), son of
Edmund Rice (1594–1663)

References

External links
 

American geologists
American explorers
People from Boston
Commandeurs of the Légion d'honneur
1875 births
1956 deaths
Harvard Medical School alumni
Noble and Greenough School alumni
Harvard College alumni